Fukd ID is the name of an imprint on the Chemikal Underground record label, established to allow them to release a wider range of musical styles from artists who might not necessarily be signed to the label. Notable releases include the first EP from the band Interpol.

List of releases
 Fukd ID #1 - Aereogramme
 Fukd ID #2 - Arab Strap
 Fukd ID #3 - Interpol
 Fukd ID #4 - British Meat Scene
 Fukd ID #5 - bis
 Fukd ID #6 - Ben Tramer
 Fukd ID #7 - Model Fighter
 Fukd ID #8 - Kempston, Protek & Fuller

References

British record labels
 Ep